A half note is a musical note value.

Half note may also refer to:

 Half Note, a 1985 jazz album by Clifford Jordan
 Half Note Records, a jazz label founded in 1998
 Half Note Club, a jazz club in New York City from 1957 to 1974
 Half-Note (My Little Pony), a toy pony introduced by Hasbro in 1985